List of Guggenheim Fellowships awarded in 1995

See also
 Guggenheim Fellowship

References

1995
1995 awards